Atomu (written: , , ,  or  in katakana) is a masculine Japanese given name. Notable people with the name include:

, Japanese actor
, Japanese footballer
, Japanese actor and voice actor
, Japanese golfer
, Japanese footballer

Japanese masculine given names